Amédée Louis Michel le Peletier, comte de Saint-Fargeau (9 October 1770 – 23 August 1845), also spelled Lepeletier or Lepelletier, was a French entomologist, and specialist in the Hymenoptera.

In 1833, he served as president of the Société entomologique de France.

Works
with Gaspard Auguste Brullé Histoire naturelle des insectes. Hyménoptères. Roret, Paris 1836–46 p.m.
Memoires sur le G. Gorytes Latr. Arpactus Jur. Paris 1832.
Monographia tenthredinetarum, synonimia extricata. Levrault, Paris 1823–25.
Mémoire sur quelques espéces nouvelles d’Insectes de la section des hyménoptères appelés les portetuyaux et sur les caractères de cette famille et des genres qui la composent. Paris 1806.
Défense de Félix Lepeletier. Vatar, Paris 1796/97.
with   Jean Guillaume Audinet-Serville a treatise on Hemiptera to Guillaume-Antoine Olivier's Histoire naturelle. Entomologie, ou histoire naturelle des Crustacés, des Arachnides et des Insectes (Encyclopédie Méthodique)

References

External links
Histoire naturelle des insectes. Hyménoptères at BDH 
Atlas
Volume 1
Volume 2
Volume 3
Volume 4

French entomologists
French taxonomists
1770 births
1845 deaths
Hymenopterists
18th-century French zoologists
19th-century French zoologists
Presidents of the Société entomologique de France